Dionisio Lazzari (17 October 1617 – 9 August 1689) was an Italian sculptor and architect.

He was born in Naples in 1617, the son of Jacopo Lazzari and Caterina Papini. Jacopo was born in Florence, and his and Dionisio's work shows Tuscan influences. In Dionisio, these are combined with the style of the Neapolitan baroque, as exemplified by Cosimo Fanzago. One of Lazzari's pupils was Arcangelo Guglielmelli.

His characteristic work was in marble inlaid with different coloured precious stones, often in abstract designs, though he also produced naturalistic works of vases, flowers and putti.

Main works
Most of the works of Dionisio Lazzari are found in Naples:
1642: Firrao chapel, San Paolo Maggiore
1654 (design): Church and Convent of the Girolamini
1662: Façade of San Lorenzo Maggiore (later redone by Ferdinando Sanfelice)
1646 (onwards): Multiple chapels and decorations of Naples Cathedral
1674 - 1691: Altar of San Teresa church
 Santa Maria di Montesanto, Naples

Sources

1617 births
1689 deaths
17th-century Italian architects
Architects from Naples
17th-century Italian sculptors
Italian male sculptors